Variel Alejandro Sánchez Ordóñez (born 14 December 1989) is a Colombian actor and airplane pilot. He stood out for Vicente Guerra, in the first season of A mano limpia. He subsequently participated in the series The Girl, series for which he won two awards for best supporting actor at the TVyNovelas Awards Colombia, and India Catalina Awards in 2017. And recently in the series El Barón, and Loquito por ti.

Biography 
Sánchez born on 14 December 1989 as Variel Alejandro Sánchez Ordóñez in Bogota, Colombia. He is the son of renowned Colombian actor Julio Sánchez Coccaro. He is married to actress and model Estefanía Godoy, with whom he has two children. He studied body expression at the Chrysalis a Butterfly School, and at Clara Luna, a theater and singing school. In addition to that he graduated as a commercial airplane pilot, but currently does not work in such a job.

Filmography

References

External links 
 

1989 births
Colombian male television actors
21st-century Colombian male actors
Living people
Male actors from Bogotá